The Lindfield Rugby Club is an Australian rugby union football club in Sydney. The club's home ground is in the suburb of East Lindfield. Lindfield competes in the NSWSRU competition. The Lindfield Juniors Rugby club is also one of the largest for junior players in Australia.

History
The Lindfield Rugby Club was founded in 1919 by soldiers returning from the first world war.
 The club played in local rugby competitions before being admitted to the Metropolitan Sub-Districts Rugby Union in 1948 and winning the minor premiership in that year.

Lindfield remained in first division for most of the next five decades, being relegated once for the 1987 season before returning to the top level for another eight seasons until 1995. The club then spent most of the next twenty years in lower divisions, aside from two seasons in first division for 2009 and 2010. Lindfield finally secured promotion to the top level again for 2016, but the club was found to have breached amateur status a few weeks before the end of the season and was prohibited from playing for the remainder of the year before being relegated to second division for 2017.

International players
The first Lindfield player to be selected for Australia in international rugby was Bruce Taafe in 1969. More recently, players including Wallabies Stirling Mortlock, Andrew Blades, and Cameron Blades and Canadian international Evan Olmstead have been Lindfield club members.

References

Bibliography

 
 Pollard, Jack: Australian Rugby: The game and the players. (1994) Pan Macmillan. 

Rugby union teams in Sydney
Rugby clubs established in 1919
1919 establishments in Australia
Lindfield, New South Wales